Fray or Frays or The Fray may refer to:

Arts, entertainment, and media

Fictional entities
Fray, a phenomenon in Terry Pratchett's The Carpet People
Fray, the main character in the video games:
Fray in Magical Adventure
Fray CD
Melaka Fray, the title character of the comic book series Fray

Music
Albums
The Fray (album), a 2009 self-titled album by The Fray

Groups
The Fray, an American rock band
Race the Fray, an Australian rock band, originally known as "The Fray"

Songs
"Fray", a song from the album 14 Shades of Grey by Staind

Other arts, entertainment, and media
Fray (comics), a comic book series by Joss Whedon
 Fray (film), a 2012 film

People
 Fray (surname)

Places
 Frays River in London

Other uses
"Fray", a Spanish language title, a shortening of the word "fraile", used by Friars and members of certain religious orders in Spain and the former Spanish colonial territories, such as the Philippines and the American Southwest

See also
 Affray, public order offence
 Frey (disambiguation)